Inferuncus is a genus of moths in the family Pterophoridae.

Species
Inferuncus infesta (Meyrick, 1934)
Inferuncus nigreus Gibeaux, 1994
Inferuncus pentheres (Bigot, 1969)
Inferuncus stoltzei Gielis, 1990

Platyptiliini
Moth genera